"QSO" is the 7th episode of the fifth season of the American television drama series Person of Interest. It is the 97th overall episode of the series and is written by Hilary Benefiel and directed by Kate Woods. It aired on CBS in the United States and on CTV in Canada on May 24, 2016, airing back-to-back with the follow-up episode "Reassortment".

The series revolves around a computer program for the federal government known as "The Machine" that is capable of collating all sources of information to predict terrorist acts and to identify people planning them. A team follows "irrelevant" crimes: lesser level of priority for the government. However, their security and safety is put in danger following the activation of a new program named Samaritan. In the episode, Root is tasked by the Machine to infiltrate a radio show to investigate a secret code sent through interference noises, which may lead her closer to Shaw. The title refers to "amateur radio contact", an exchange of information between two amateur radio stations. A contact is often referred to by the Q code QSO.

According to Nielsen Media Research, the episode was seen by an estimated 5.33 million household viewers and gained a 0.9/3 ratings share among adults aged 18–49. The episode received positive reviews from critics, who praised the writing and acting (particularly Acker, Shahi and Chapman).

Plot
Fusco (Kevin Chapman) is hospitalized after the incident at the demolition site. Root (Amy Acker) visits him and feeling guilty over having him investigate the case, presents Fusco with an exit strategy: fake IDs for him and his son to escape in case the situation worsens. As Reese (Jim Caviezel) and Finch (Michael Emerson) keep guard on Fusco, Root decides to continue working.

Root is sent through different missions by the Machine but she grows tired and demands that the Machine send her to find more about Shaw. The Machine redirects her to AM 520, WKCP, a radio station. She gets a producer position for Max Greene (Scott Adsit), host of "Mysterious Transmissions", a conspiracy theorist radio show. She overhears a phone call between Max and a man named Warren, revealing that they worked together on a discovery: the interference noise on the show served to send a code. Warren then calls the show to threaten to commit suicide so Reese goes to his apartment to save him. However, despite Max talking with Warren on the phone, Reese finds that Warren has been dead for hours. Both Reese and Root come to the conclusion that Samaritan is involved and will kill Max for discovering the code.

Root and Max escape the cabin booth after being locked up and evade the hitmen. The team realizes the code is sent to operatives to receive orders from Samaritan to all of its facilities. Root then realizes that this is why the Machine assigned her to be there: to send a message to Shaw. At Shaw's location, having failed with progress in the simulations, Jeremy Lambert (Julian Ovenden) takes Shaw (Sarah Shahi) on a walk throughout the hospital to show their progress but Shaw is more concerned about stopping with the simulations and refuses to even try anything they offer. However, she is tricked into killing a doctor in the hospital, having thought it was a simulation.

Root uses an EMF meter to broadcast a message, which is heard by Shaw through a radio in her room just as she planned to commit suicide. Despite being subdued again, Shaw gets a glimmer of hope from hearing Root and starts preparing her escape. Root tries to bargain herself with Samaritan to get to Shaw's location but Reese and Max cut the power off before the deal is made. They escape and plan Max to live with a new ID. However, Max refuses to escape after everything he learned on the day and Reese and Root are forced to leave him behind, warning him to just ignore the events of the day or Samaritan will catch him. He agrees to the terms. After Fusco recovers, he is visited by Finch who refuses to waver from his stance that keeping Fusco in the dark keeps him safe. Fusco points out that it is not working, and quits the team.

However, upon returning to the train station, they find Max revealing everything on the air. But due to his conspiracy theorist persona, the public does not take him seriously. Nevertheless, his secretary, tasked by Samaritan, poisons his drink and kills him. Finch is horrified of the Machine's mission as it didn't take Max's life into account. Root later speaks with the Machine, thanking her for getting the message to Shaw. She then contacts one of the people he saved for a favor: go to the Žemaitija National Park for her next mission, which involves missile silos.

Reception

Viewers
In its original American broadcast, "QSO" was seen by an estimated 5.33 million household viewers and gained a 0.9/3 ratings share among adults aged 18–49, according to Nielsen Media Research. This means that 0.9 percent of all households with televisions watched the episode, while 3 percent of all households watching television at that time watched it. This was a 3% decrease in viewership from the previous episode, which was watched by 5.49 million viewers with a 0.9/3 in the 18-49 demographics. With these ratings, Person of Interest was the second most watched show on CBS for the night, behind The Price Is Right Primetime Special, third on its timeslot and seventh for the night in the 18-49 demographics, behind The Real O'Neals, The Price Is Right Primetime Special, Fresh Off the Boat, The Flash, Dancing with the Stars, and The Voice.

With Live +7 DVR factored in, the episode was watched by 7.64 million viewers with a 1.3 in the 18-49 demographics.

Critical reviews
"QSO" received positive reviews from critics. Matt Fowler of IGN gave the episode a "great" 8.3 out of 10 rating and wrote in his verdict, "'QSO' ramped up the Samaritan conspiracy arc (secret coded messages?) while bringing Root a few big steps closer to Shaw. Meaning, Shaw was able to find a glimmer of hope during her darkest hour in captivity. This episode also gave us a nice single-chapter character in Max, who wasn't a number, but became a casualty of both circumstance and his own 'free will.'"

Alexa Planje of The A.V. Club gave the episode a "B+" grade and wrote, "Regardless of the episode's untapped comedic potential, the writers wring the drama from this story in typical Person of Interest fashion."

Chancellor Agard of Entertainment Weekly wrote, "Tonight we received a double dose of Person of Interest. The first episode, 'QSO,' was a Root-centric episode that finds her taking on a number that will lead her to Shaw, and it's definitely the better of the two."

Sean McKenna of TV Fanatic gave the episode a 4.4 star rating out of 5 and wrote "'QSO' and 'Reassortment' were solid episodes, and it's clear that things are ramping up to what should be a intense conclusion."

References

External links 
 

Person of Interest (TV series) episodes
2016 American television episodes